Ig heavy chain V-III region VH26 is a protein that in humans is encoded by the IGHV@ gene.

IGHV is the immunoglobulin  heavy chain variable region genes; in B-cell neoplasms like chronic lymphocytic leukemia, mutations of IGHV are associated with better responses to some treatments and with prolonged survival.

See also
 IGH@

References

Further reading

Proteins